Ferenc Kropacsek (7 September 1899 – 1994) was a Hungarian footballer. He played in two matches for the Hungary national football team in 1924. He was also part of Hungary's squad for the football tournament at the 1924 Summer Olympics, but he did not play in any matches.

References

External links
 

1899 births
1994 deaths
Hungarian footballers
Hungary international footballers
Footballers from Budapest
Association football goalkeepers
Footballers at the 1924 Summer Olympics
Olympic footballers of Hungary